MF  Sveti Krševan is a ro-ro vehicle and passenger ferry owned and operated by Jadrolinija, the Croatian state-owned ferry company. She was built in 2004 at the Kraljevica Shipyard Ltd. in Kraljevica, Croatia. As of June 2010 she serves on the local route Orebić—Dominče, connecting the Pelješac peninsula and the island of Korčula in southern Dalmatia.

MF Sveti Krševan is a Hull 535 class ferry, along with her twins, the MF Supetar and MF Cres, which are all operated by Jadrolinija. The ferries all have a capacity of 600 passengers and 100 cars and their maximum speed is 11.5 knots.

References

External links

MF Sveti Krševan at the Jadrolinija official website 

Ferries of Croatia
Ships built in Croatia
2004 ships